Cryptocheiridium is a genus of pseudoscorpions in the family Cheiridiidae.

Cryptocheiridium lucifugum is one of the animals found in the Batu Caves, Selangor, Malaysia.

†Cryptocheiridium antiquum was found in Dominican amber (Miocene of Dominican Republic).

References

External links 

 Cryptocheiridium at Biolib
 Cryptocheiridium at biodiversity.org.au
 Cryptocheiridium at fossilworks

Pseudoscorpion genera
Cheiridiidae